João Fernando Mendes Ramalho (born 6 January 1954) is a former Portuguese football player.

He played 12 seasons and 284 games in the Primeira Liga for Vitória de Guimarães, Beira-Mar and Sporting Espinho.

Club career
He made his Primeira Liga debut for Beira-Mar on 10 September 1972 in a game against Farense.

References

External links
 ZeroZero Profile
 Fora de Jogo Profile

1954 births
Living people
Footballers from Porto
Portuguese footballers
S.C. Beira-Mar players
Primeira Liga players
Vitória S.C. players
S.C. Espinho players
F.C. Felgueiras players
Liga Portugal 2 players
Varzim S.C. players
Association football defenders